Felipe Almeida Wu (born 11 June 1992 in São Paulo) is a Brazilian sport shooter. He won a silver medal in the Men's 10m air pistol event at the 2016 Summer Olympics in Rio de Janeiro.

Career

He won a silver medal in the boys' air pistol at the 2010 Summer Youth Olympics in Singapore, and then added the gold to his career hardware on his senior debut at the 2015 Pan American Games in Toronto.

Wu made his international shooting debut, as an eighteen-year-old, at the 2010 Summer Youth Olympics in Singapore. There, he picked up the silver medal with a total score of 676.0 in the boys' air pistol, finishing closely behind Ukrainian shooter and 2012 Olympian Denys Kushnirov by three-tenths of a point margin.

Despite having missed out his bid for the 2012 Summer Olympics in London, Wu managed to improve his lifetime best of 201.8 points for the final meet record and his first senior title in the men's air pistol at the 2015 Pan American Games in Toronto, Ontario, Canada. Following his gold medal victory at the Games, Wu has occupied one of the nine places entrusted to the host nation's squad and prepared training to compete for Brazil at the 2016 Summer Olympics in Rio de Janeiro.

Felipe Wu won gold medal in the men's air pistol in Bangkok, Thailand, first stage of 2016 ISSF World Cup.

At the 2016 Summer Olympics in Rio de Janeiro, Felipe won a silver medal in the Men's 10m air pistol event. This was Brazil's first medal at the first Olympics in Brazil. Felipe is also the first Brazilian of Chinese descent to win a medal at the Olympics. Following this success, Felipe became well-known in Brazil for his exploits.

He competed at the 2020 Summer Olympics.

References

External links

1992 births
Living people
Brazilian male sport shooters
Brazilian sportspeople of Chinese descent
Shooters at the 2010 Summer Youth Olympics
Shooters at the 2015 Pan American Games
Sportspeople from São Paulo
Pan American Games gold medalists for Brazil
Olympic shooters of Brazil
Shooters at the 2016 Summer Olympics
Medalists at the 2016 Summer Olympics
Olympic silver medalists for Brazil
Olympic medalists in shooting
Pan American Games medalists in shooting
South American Games gold medalists for Brazil
South American Games medalists in shooting
Competitors at the 2010 South American Games
Competitors at the 2014 South American Games
Federal University of ABC alumni
Medalists at the 2015 Pan American Games
Shooters at the 2020 Summer Olympics
20th-century Brazilian people
21st-century Brazilian people